The Detroit mayoral election of 2005 took place on November 8, 2005. It saw the reelection of incumbent mayor Kwame Kilpatrick to a second term.

Background
In 2001, Kwame Kilpatrick, at the age of 31, became the youngest mayor ever elected in Detroit.

In 2005, Kilpatrick, now seeking reelection to a second term as mayor, found himself the subject numerous scandals, had faced budget deficits as mayor, and had faced a poor city economy.

Among the scandals Kilpatrick faced were allegations that he had used city funds to enrich himself and his family.

Candidates
Clifford Brookins II
Angelo Scott Brown
Stanley Michael Christmas
Hansen Clarke, Michigan State Senator since 2003, former member of the Michigan House of Representatives (1991–1992 and 1999–2002)
Roy Godwin
Freman Hendrix, former Deputy Mayor of Detroit (1997–2001)
Clayton C. Johnson
Sarella S. Johnson
Kwame Kilpatrick, incumbent mayor
Sharon McPhail, Detroit City Council member since 2002, candidate for mayor in 1993
Tiana K. Walton

Campaigning
In the general election, polls and media coverage showed Freman Hendrix to be the frontrunner, leading over the embattled Kilpatrick. Hendrix promised to both restore dignity to the office of mayor, which he faulted Kilpatrick with having eroded, and prosperity back to the city at large.

Many political pundits saw Kilpatrick as a weakened incumbent. He had become the first incumbent to place second in a mayoral primary in Detroit.

Amid his reelection campaign, Kilpatrick made an appearance delivering an eulogy at the highly-covered funeral of Rosa Parks, held shortly before the general election. This was seen as helpful to his reelection. Kilpatrick was also able to garner strong support from younger voters.

Polling

Results

Primary
The primary was held on August 2, 2005.

Freman Hendrix and incumbent mayor Kwame Kilpatrick won the top-two spots, thereby advancing to the general election.

General election

Notes

References

Detroit
Detroit
2005
mayoral election